Gauriganj is a constituency of the Uttar Pradesh Legislative Assembly covering the city of Gauriganj in the Amethi district of Uttar Pradesh, India.

Gauriganj is one of five assembly constituencies in the Amethi Lok Sabha constituency. Since 2008, this assembly constituency is numbered 185 amongst 403 constituencies.

Election results

2022

2017

Samajwadi Party candidate Rakesh Pratap Singh won in 2017 defeating Indian National Congress candidate Mohammad Nayem by a margin of 26,419 votes. 
On 31 October 2021, Singh resigned from the 17th Uttar Pradesh Assembly citing "non-fulfilment of promises" by the ruling Bharatiya Janata Party government.

References

External links
 

Assembly constituencies of Uttar Pradesh
Amethi district